Minkhaung I of Ava (also spelled Mingaung; 1373–1421) was king of Ava from 1400 to 1421. He is best remembered in Burmese history for his epic struggles against King Razadarit of Hanthawaddy Pegu in the Forty Years' War (1385–1424). As king, Minkhaung continued his father Swa Saw Ke's policy to restore the Pagan Empire. Under the military leadership of his eldest son Minye Kyawswa, Ava nearly succeeded. While he ultimately failed to conquer Hanthawaddy and Launggyet Arakan, he was able to bring in most of cis-Salween Shan states to the Ava orbit.

Early life

The future king was born in a small village called Gazun-Nyeint (present-day northern Sagaing Region) on 13 September 1373. His father King Swa Saw Ke of Ava had met his commoner mother Saw Beza earlier in the year during a military campaign against Mohnyin. Chronicles say that after giving birth to the child, Beza showed up at the Ava palace to present the male son, as instructed to by the king. The child was named Min Swe. The king made Beza a junior queen, and had two more children with her: Theiddat and Thupaba Dewi.

Min Swe grew up in Ava (Inwa) until he was eight. His life at the palace was not all well. Their older half-brother Tarabya, who was born to a senior queen, constantly bullied both Swe and Theiddat. The bullying became a serious problem, and in 1381/82, the king had to send away Swe and Theiddat to a small monastery near Pinle to study under the chief primate (Thinga-Yaza). The two princes studied under the learned monk, and traveled around the region, including Taungdwingyi, Minbu, Ngape and Padein, with their attendants.

Governor of Pyinzi
Circa April 1385, Swa appointed Tarabya his heir-apparent. The king kept Swe out of Tarabya's reach, and appointed his 11-year-old son governor of Pyinzi, a small town about 85 km southwest of Ava. He also gave Swe command of the 33-member Pyinzi cavalry. Swe would rule Pyinzi for the next 15 years. Chronicles have little information about Swe's period as governor except that his rivalry with Tarabya continued, and that the rivalry may have cost Ava's best chance of defeating Hanthawaddy Pegu.

In 1385, the king ordered his two eldest sons to lead a two-pronged invasion of the southern kingdom in what would become known as the Forty Years' War. Tarabya commanded the First Army (7000 infantry, 500 cavalry, 20 elephants) while Swe led the Second Army (6000 infantry, 500 cavalry, 20 elephants). The two princes were advised by Ava's best commanders, including Thilawa of Yamethin and Theinkhathu Saw Hnaung. The Ava command expected an easy victory over an overpowered opponent. But Ava forces could not break through well-organized Peguan defenses for five months. Then, King Razadarit of Hanthawaddy made a tactical error by coming out of his fortified capital to attack Ava positions near Pankyaw. Tarabya's army pounced, driving back and pursuing Razadarit's army. Meanwhile Swe's army had positioned in the path of retreat of the Hanthawaddy army. Tarabya, the overall commander-in-chief, sent a messenger, ordering Swe to hold his position and not to engage Razadarit until his army could reach the scene. But Swe ignored the order and the advice of his seasoned commanders, and ordered his troops to engage. Razadarit's army defeated Swe's premature attack, and got back inside Pegu. Five days later, with the rainy season approaching, the invasion was called off.

Ava would come to rue the missed opportunity. Swa kept Swe from the next invasion in the following dry season. Swe was assigned to guard the capital while Swa and Tarabya invaded the southern country again. The second invasion fared no better. Razadarit committed no more errors, and hunkered down. Ava troops could not break through Pegu's defenses and had to retreat before the rainy season arrived. Swe was to get his chance again to go to the front in the 1390–91 campaign. But this time, he commanded just a regiment, and was directly under the command of Tarabya. At any rate, their army could not break through the Pegu defenses at Pankyaw although the campaign ended in a truce.

Marriage

In 1389/90, Swe was married to Princess Shin Mi-Nauk, daughter of the chief of Mohnyin, in a marriage of state. The marriage was part of the effort by Ava and Mohnyin to mend their fences after the 1387–88 war between the two states. On the advice of Chief Minister Min Yaza, King Swa selected Swe to marry Mi-Nauk. While the peace with Mohnyin did not last—Ava and Mohnyin were to fight another war just three years later—the marriage between Swe and Mi-Nauk lasted. The couple had four children at Pyinzi: Minye Kyawswa, Saw Pyei Chantha, Minye Thihathu and Minye Kyawhtin.

Accession
In April 1400, King Swa Saw Ke died and Tarabya ascended the throne. The new king kept his two half brothers at an arm's length. Neither Swe nor Theiddat controlled a sizable army. When Tarabya became mentally unstable about five months into his reign, and other pretenders began circling the throne, Swe was not in a strong-enough position to challenge them. In November, Gov. Thihapate of Tagaung assassinated Tarabya, and tried to seize the throne. But the court executed the usurper, and offered the throne to Min Swe. But Swe was concerned about Gov. Maha Pyauk of Yamethin, who controlled a sizable army, and told the court to offer the throne to Pyauk instead. Theiddat implored Swe to reconsider. When his brother still refused, Theiddat took matters into his own hand. Theiddat and his small band of men ambushed Pyauk's much bigger army near Ava while Pyauk was not expecting. Pyauk was killed. On 25 November 1400, Min Swe became king of Ava. He assumed the title of Minkhaung (မင်းခေါင်; "Foremost Lord" or "Paramount Lord").

Early reign

Consolidation of power
Minkhaung spent his first year consolidating his power. He kept Min Yaza as chief minister, and appointed Yaza's son Pauk Hla governor Yamethin, and Yaza's son-in-law Thado Theinkhathu governor of Badon and Tabayin. He also appointed Theiddat governor of Sagaing with the title of Thiri Zeya Thura but stopped short of declaring him his heir-apparent. While Sagaing was a sizable province that used to be an independent kingdom, the younger brother was never satisfied with the reward, and held a "lingering resentment that would later rear its ugly head".

Invasion by Pegu (1401–03)
The succession crisis at Ava did not go unnoticed. The Arakanese raided western Irrawaddy towns. In Pegu, King Razadarit assessed that Minkhaung's hold on power was still weak, and planned to place a nominee of his own. It would be payback for Ava's attempts to dislodge him early in his reign. Throughout 1401, Razadarit prepared an invasion river-borne fleet that could transport not only troops but even horses and elephants. When the dry season began, Hanthawaddy forces invaded by the Irrawaddy river, attacking all the riverside towns and cities, including their main targets, Prome (Pyay) and Ava (Inwa).

The Forty Year's War had resumed after a 10-year hiatus. Initially, Hanthawaddy held the advantage. Ava did not have a navy that could challenge Pegu's massive flotilla. Ava forces had to defend inside the fortified towns along the river: Prome, Myede, Sagu, Salin, Pakhan Nge, Salay, Pagan (Bagan), Talok, Pakhan Gyi, Sagaing and Ava. The Pegu navy held complete control of the Irrawaddy (as far north as Tagaung) but the blockades were not enough to force a surrender. Pegu's attempt to storm the ancient capital of Pagan failed. Minkhaung bought time by asking the monks to broker a truce. Protracted truce negotiations went on from April to  June/July 1402 but the start of rainy season forced Razadarit's hand, and the Hanthawaddy fleet retreated from Ava. Minkhaung's vassals now rallied around him. He was able to assemble a sizable force, which he sent after the rainy season to relieve Prome. The Ava army decisively defeated the invaders south of Prome on 26 December 1402, forcing Pegu to ask for terms about ten days after the battle.

Minkhaung sent an embassy led by Min Yaza to Pegu to negotiate a treaty. He wanted to exact a price from Pegu. After five months of negotiations, the two sides signed a peace treaty. The boundary of their kingdoms was fixed a little to the south of Prome. Pegu agreed to share the customs revenue of Bassein (Pathein), and supply 30 elephants annually. In return, Minkhaung sent his only sister Thupaba Dewi to be queen of Razadarit in a marriage alliance.

Expansion

Cis-Salween Shan states (1404–1406)
Minkhaung had come out far stronger from the war. What began as an existential threat to his rule had turned to an agreement that was largely in his favor. In the following years, the king, with the advice of Min Yaza, resumed the expansionist policy of his father in order to restore the Pagan Empire. His first targets were the nearer (cis-Salween) Shan states. According to the Burmese chronicles, the acquisition drive was largely peaceful, and accomplished through diplomatic missions led by Min Yaza to Onbaung (Hsipaw) in 1404/05, Nyaungshwe in 1405/06 and Mohnyin in 1406. But the Ming records say that Ava's missions were in fact military expeditions, and that the Ming court became especially concerned after Ava's capture of Mohnyin in 1406 that killed the sawbwa of Mohnyin and his son. On 25 August 1406, the Ming court sent an embassy to Ava to end the "aggression" against the Shan states.

Minkhaung initially brushed off the Chinese concerns. It was not until 1408 when he was about to resume the war with Pegu that he sent an embassy to Nanjing. The Ming records say that the Ava representative offered a formal apology to the emperor for "having occupied" the Ming vassals "without authority" on 28 May 1408; but despite the promise, Ava was encouraging Hsenwi to rebel against the Ming in 1408–1409. By September 1409, the Ming court was considering a punitive action against Ava. The simmering tensions would lead to war between Ava and Ming China between 1412 and 1415.

Arakan (1406)
Despite Chinese concerns, by August 1406, Ava had gained allegiance of all of its surrounding Shan states. Minkhaung now eyed Arakan. The western kingdom was a tributary of Ava between 1373/74 and 1385/86 during his father's reign but escaped Ava's orbit at the start of the Forty Years' War. Using alleged Arakanese raids on Ava's western districts, he sent a 10,000-strong army led by his eldest son Minye Kyawswa to Arakan. On 29 November 1406, Ava forces took the Arakanese capital Launggyet, and Min Saw Mon fled to Bengal. Minkhaung appointed Gov. Anawrahta of Kalay king of Arakan.

Heir-apparent selection and its fallout
After Arakan, Minkhaung was riding high. He was greatly impressed by his son's performance, and wanted to make him his heir apparent. With the advice of Min Yaza, he sent away Tarabya's eldest son and potential rival to the throne Prince Min Nyo to Kalay, a frontier state by the Manipur border, as governor. He tried to appease his brother Theiddat, governor of Sagaing, by giving him command of the Northern Cavalry. The king then appointed Minye Kyawswa his heir apparent, and married him to Saw Min Hla, a cousin of the groom.

Theiddat felt totally betrayed. The younger brother bitterly complained that Minkhaung would not have become king were it not for him. Min Yaza tried to but could not mollify Theiddat. Minkhaung had Theiddat arrested but later released him after Min Yaza intervened. Shortly after, Theiddat fled to Pegu in 1407.

Middle reign

Deterioration of relations with Pegu
Far more than Ming China, Pegu viewed Ava's acquisition spree with great alarm. Realizing that Pegu was now Ava's only remaining target, Razadarit decided to act. He readily gave shelter to Theiddat although he knew such an action would be regarded as a declaration of war against Ava. He broke the 1403 agreement: Pegu stopped sending the annual shipment of 30 elephants and Ava's share of customs revenue of the Bassein port.

Meanwhile, Minkhaung tried to solidify his hold over Arakan by sending his eldest daughter Saw Pyei Chantha to be the wife of Anawrahta as well as a senior minister to aid the vassal king. He also sent an embassy to Chiang Mai, and a long overdue mission to China in early 1408. According to the Razadarit Ayedawbon chronicle, Razadarit viewed Ava's mission to Chiang Mai as an attempt by Ava to secure its rear, and decided that war was inevitable.

Resumption of war with Pegu (1408–1410)
In March 1408, Razadarit sent in an invasion force to Arakan, catching Ava completely by surprise. Its forces had been deployed in the north. The Ava court had not expected Pegu to act first, or an attack on Arakan. Before Ava could send any help, Pegu forces took Launggyet by late March/early April 1408. Razadarit had Minkhaung's son-in-law Anawrahta executed, and raised Minkhaung's daughter Pyei Chantha as his queen. Minkhaung was furious. Although the rainy season was just a month away, the king ordered an immediate invasion of the south, overruling his ministers' suggestion to wait until the dry season.

In May 1408, Minkhaung himself led two armies (26,000 men, 2200 horses, 100 elephants), and invaded the southern country. What ensued was a complete disaster. Predictably, Ava forces got bogged down in the swamps of Lower Burma. Three months into the invasion, Ava's troops were running out of supplies due to bad weather as well as Hanthawaddy ambushes on supply lines. For his part, Razadarit could not match Ava's manpower, and ordered two attempts on Minkhaung's life. The first attempt by Hanthawaddy special forces to ambush Minkhaung's small contingent was broken up on the warning by Theiddat who was with the Peguan forces. It turned out that Theiddat could not betray his elder brother. Razadarit had Theiddat executed for the warning. The second attempt nearly succeeded. Razadarit sent a team of commandos led by his top general Lagun Ein to infiltrate the enemy camp. Lagun Ein got inside Minkhaung's tent but refused to kill a sleeping Minkhaung.

At any rate, Ava forces retreated  August 1408. Razadarit came out and attacked the retreating troops. Ava forces were routed, and Minkhaung's queen Mi-Nauk was captured. Razadarit now had both the mother and the daughter in his harem. Razadarit attempted to pick off Prome by launching an attack on the city on 22 November 1408 but the attack faltered.

Minkhaung was forced to regroup. In December 1409, he again invaded with two armies (14,000 men, 1400 horses, 100 elephants). His armies again could not break through. Five months into the invasion  May 1410, Razadarit counterattacked. Near Tharrawaddy, Razadarit and Minkhaung faced in battle over elephants, and the Hanthawaddy king drove back Minkhaung. The remaining Ava army was routed; several infantry, cavalry and elephants were captured.

Multi-front war (1410–1415)
After the two consecutive disastrous defeats, a dejected Minkhaung handed over the military leadership to Minye Kyawswa. His eldest son was eager to have a chance to take on Razadarit who held both his mother and sister in his harem. Over the next five years, Minkhaung would call on Minye Kyawswa to wage war against his enemies on multiple fronts: against Hanthawaddy in both Lower Burma and Arakan, and against Ming China and its vassal states in the north. His son proved a gifted commander, and Ava would come closest to reassembling the Pagan Empire.

Lower Burma and Arakan (1410–1412)
Minye Kyawswa brought a fresh thinking to Ava's battle plan. Instead of directly attacking the well-defended Pegu capital region, he would attack what he believed were less defended regions. In late 1410, the prince invaded the Irrawaddy delta by river and land with an army (7000 men, 600 horses, and 40 elephants) and a navy that transported 7000 men. Combined Ava forces proceeded to attack the key delta cities of Myaungmya and Bassein (Pathein). But the prince found that the key delta cities were well fortified and prepared for long sieges. He pulled back his forces to Prome, and invaded Arakan in early 1411. There, he successfully drove out Pegu-installed vassals, and appointed Ava's commanders as governor-generals.

Meanwhile, Razadarit sought an alliance with Hsenwi in an attempt to open a second front. After the rainy season of 1411, the Hanthawaddy king sent two armies to Arakan. The Ava garrison at Sandoway fell before Ava reinforcements (8000 troops, 300 horses, 30 elephants) led by Minye Kyawswa arrived. Ava forces laid siege to the city for the next three months. But Hsenwi opened a new front by invading Ava territory in the north. The invasion was considered serious enough that Minkhaung recalled Minye Kyawswa from Arakan. After the withdrawal, reinforced Hanthawaddy troops went on to drive out the Ava garrison at Launggyet in 1412. (According to the Arakanese chronicle Rakhine Razawin Thit, Ava retained a toehold at the Khway-thin-taung garrison in northern Arakan until 1416/17. But Ava would not send a major force to Arakan, and the western state would remain a Hanthawaddy vassal at least until Razadarit's death.)

Hsenwi (1412)
Hsenwi's invasion was not just due to Hanthawaddy's urging. The powerful Shan state had been ordered by the Ming court to retaliate against Ava's annexation of Mohnyin six years earlier. It is unclear if Minkhaung and his court realized the gravity of the situation. Even if they did, their actions show they were not concerned about an escalating war against Ming-backed states in their northern border. Minkhaung was determined to teach Hsenwi a lesson. After Minye Kyawswa decisively defeated the Hsenwi force near Wetwin (present-day Pyin Oo Lwin), the king agreed to a plan to attack Hsenwi itself.

Minye Kyawswa went on to lay siege to the city of Hsenwi throughout the rainy season of 1412. The Yunnan government sent an army (20,000 men and 2000 cavalry) to relieve the siege. The Ava army then ambushed the larger Chinese army as they came out of the forest. The Chinese army was driven back. Five Chinese commanders, 2000 troops and 1000 horses were taken prisoner. Ava wanted to finish off Hsenwi and the siege went on for one more month until  November 1412. But Pegu came to Hsenwi's aid this time by launching a massive attack on Prome after the rainy season. The attack was serious enough that Minkhaung himself marched with his army to relieve Prome, and ordered Minye Kyawswa to join him on the southern front.

Lower Burma (1412–1413)
Over the next four months the father-son team tried to break the Hanthawaddy siege of Prome. They made no meaningful progress until when the Hanthawaddy command suddenly lost its two most senior generals: Gen. Byat Za (natural causes) and Gen. Lagun Ein (KIA). Shaken by the deaths, Razadarit hastily retreated. Minye Kyawswa proposed an immediate invasion of the south. Minkhaung was weary but allowed his son to carry out the plan. In April 1413, Minye Kyawswa took eastern delta towns of Dala–Twante and Dagon. But the Ava advance was halted at the battle of Hmawbi in which Gen. Letya Pyanchi of Prome was mortally wounded. Minkhaung ordered a pause as it was just a month away from the rainy season and the army did not have enough strength. The crown prince ignored his father's order, and resumed the march to Pegu in May 1413. But the Hanthawaddy defenses stopped Ava forces outside Dala and at Syriam. The fighting paused during the rainy season of 1413. Razadarit again sent emissaries to northern Shan states and Lan Na in search of alliances.

Northern Burma and Maw (1413–1414)
Ava's northern front was never quiet after the siege of Hsenwi. According to the Ming Shilu, the Yongle Emperor ordered another attack on Ava. In 1413, while the main Ava armies were in the south, Chinese-backed Hsenwi forces raided Ava's northern territories, destroying "over 20 cities and stockades". The captured elephants, horses, and other goods were presented at the Chinese capital in September 1413. According to the Burmese chronicles, the attack on Myedu was carried out by another Shan state, Maw (Mong Mao/Mawdon Mawke). As usual, Minkhaung recalled Minye Kyawswa to Ava, and sent his middle son Minye Thihathu to Prome to take over the southern command. At Ava, Minye Kyawswa marched north to take on the Maw forces. His forces defeated Maw forces at Myedu, and chased the enemy to the Chinese border.

Lower Burma (1414–1415)
The Ava command apparently considered the victory in the north decisive. Although the Chinese would be back later, Minkhaung and the court now blithely planned a full scale invasion of the south. Ava had collected a large invasion force: an army consisted of 8000 men, 200 horses and 80 elephants, and a navy consisting of 13,000 men, and over 1800 ships of all sizes. In October 1414, Minye Kyawswa launched the invasion of the western Irrawaddy delta. Although Hanthawaddy forces put up a spirited defense, Ava forces had gained complete control of the delta by the end of December. Razadarit evacuated Pegu, and moved to Martaban (Mottama). The Ava command planned a pincer movement on Pegu from Toungoo and from Dala. But the attack on Pegu would be delayed as the Chinese forces invaded from the north. Minkhaung managed to send an army which forced the Chinese army to retreat.

The Chinese attack provided a much-needed breathing room for Razadarit. He was back in Pegu and planning counterattack by February 1415. On 2 March 1415, Razadarit himself led the army to the Dala front. On 13 March 1415, the two armies fought at Dala–Twante in one of the most famous battles in Burmese military history. Minye Kyawswa was mortally wounded in the battle. Minkhaung immediately came down with an army, and exhumed his son's body from where Razadarit had given it honorable burial. The remains were solemnly dropped into the waters near Twante. After rampaging through the delta, Minkhaung called off the invasion and left.

Late reign
Minkhaung was totally heartbroken by his eldest son's death. He recalled Thihathu from Prome, and appointed him heir apparent. The war went on languidly for two more campaigns. In 1416–1417, Razadarit tried to pick off Toungoo (Taungoo) but was defeated. In the following dry season, Minkhaung ordered a retaliatory invasion. Ava forces led by Thihathu took the delta, and again forced Razadarit to move to Martaban. They remained in the south for nearly a year. But they could not break through towards Pegu, and had to retreat. It was the last campaign during Minkhaung's reign.

The king spent his last years in piety. He died  October 1421. His nemesis Razadarit is said to have lamented when he heard the news of Minkhaung's death. Razadarit died about two months later.

Administration
Minkhaung heavily relied on the advice of his court led by Chief Minister Min Yaza. He continued to employ Pagan's administrative model of solar polities in which the high king ruled the core while semi-independent tributaries, autonomous viceroys, and governors actually controlled day-to-day administration and manpower.

Family
Chronicles state that Minkhaung had five senior queens.

One of his concubines, Saw Pan-Gon, gave birth to a daughter named Saw Nant-Tha, who was later married to his nephew Prince Min Nyo of Kale Kye-Taung.

Historiography

Notes

References

Bibliography
 
 
 
 
 
 
 
 
 
 
 
 

Ava dynasty
1373 births
1421 deaths
15th-century Burmese monarchs